Dash Kasan may refer to various places in Iran:
 Dash Kasan, Ardabil (داش كسن - Dāsh Kasan)
 Dash Kasan, Charuymaq (داش كسن - Dāsh Kasan), East Azerbaijan Province
 Dash Kasan, Meyaneh (داش كسن - Dāsh Kasan), East Azerbaijan Province
 Dash Kasan, Isfahan (داش كسن - Dāsh Kasan)
 Dash Kasan, Kurdistan (داش كسان - Dāsh Kasān)
 Dash Kasan, Chaldoran (داش كسن - Dāsh Kasan), West Azerbaijan Province
 Dash Kasan, Shahin Dezh (داش كسن - Dāsh Kasan), West Azerbaijan Province
 Dash Kasan, Zanjan (داش كسن - Dāsh Kasan)